Z Holdings Corporation is a Tokyo-based holding company. Z Holdings owns Yahoo! Japan, Japan's largest portal website; Line, Japan's largest messaging app; and PayPay, Japan's largest mobile payment app. 

Z Holdings is a subsidiary of a holding company called A Holdings, which is owned half each by  SoftBank Group and Naver Corporation. And, under the agreement by SoftBank and Naver Corporation, A Holdings is a consolidated subsidiary of SoftBank.

After finishing its merger of Yahoo! Japan and Line Corporation in March 2021, the company had a $43 billion market capitalization.

History
Originally, the company was established as Yahoo Japan Corporation in January 1996, but on October 1, 2019, it changed to a holding company structure due to a company split and changed its corporate name.

Due to the reorganization of the group centered on Yahoo Japan Corporation in 2019, the information and communication business division (Yahoo! JAPAN business) was absorbed and split into Yahoo Japan Corporation, and the financial enterprise management division Was split into Z Financial Co., Ltd. and transferred to a holding company, and is responsible for the management function of the entire group centered on subsidiaries from the time of the first corporation.

On November 2019 an announcement was made that a joint venture between Softbank Corp and Naver Corporation was agreed upon to merge the Z holdings corporation with LINE. Under which LINE, as well as various other assets of the Z Holdings Corporation, would be controlled by another holding company called A Holdings Corporation. The A Holdings Corporation ownership was then split 50% between Naver and Softbank Corp.

The agreement between SoftBank and NAVER stipulates the following matters regarding the operation of A Holdings, and A Holdings is a consolidated subsidiary of SoftBank.
Therefore, Z Holdings, a consolidated subsidiary of A Holdings, will continue to be a consolidated subsidiary of SoftBank after the business integration.

-The number of directors will be five, three of whom will be appointed by SoftBank and the other two by NAVER. The number of representative directors shall be two, one each to be appointed by SoftBank and NAVER.

-The number of auditors shall be two, one each to be appointed by SoftBank and NAVER.

-NAVER agrees to SoftBank's consolidation of A Holdings, provided that SoftBank's voting rights in A Holdings are at least 50%.

In March 2021 Line Corporation officially merged with Yahoo! Japan, which had been operated by Z Holdings. Upon integrating the two businesses and creating further platforms, the merged company aims to compete with the U.S. tech giants Google, Amazon, Facebook, and Apple and the Chinese tech giants Baidu, Alibaba, and Tencent, as well as the Japanese e-commerce giant Rakuten. The merger also gives Z Holdings three additional Asian markets where Line is popular: Taiwan, Thailand, and Indonesia.

Founded in 2021, LINE Bank is a commercial bank headquartered in Taipei, Taiwan, and owned by Z Holdings.

Timeline
2019
October 1-Implemented the following organizational restructuring and transitioned to a holding company structure .
Of the Yahoo Japan Corporation (first corporation) businesses, the businesses excluding the group business management business (Yahoo! JAPAN business) were absorbed and split into Kioimachi Split Preparation Co., Ltd. (the trade name was changed to Yahoo Japan Corporation (second corporation) on the same date). Business transfer by.
Among the businesses of Yahoo Japan Corporation (the first corporation), the business management business of a financial group company was transferred to Kioicho Financial Split Preparation Co., Ltd. (the trade name was changed to Z Financial Co., Ltd. on the same day) by a simple split.
Yahoo Japan Corporation (the first corporation) will be engaged only in the group business management business excluding financial services, and changed its trade name to Z Holdings Co., Ltd. on the same date .
November 13-The takeover bid for ZOZO Co., Ltd. was completed, and on the same day, 50.10% of the issued shares were acquired and made into a consolidated subsidiary.
November 18-Basic agreement with LINE Corporation on business integration .
December 18-Transferred shares held by SoftBank Corp. to Shiodome Z Holdings Co., Ltd., a wholly owned subsidiary, and became a consolidated subsidiary of the company .
December 23-Final agreement on business integration with Softbank, Naver, and LINE .
December 27-Corporate venture capital (English version) related business is absorbed and split into a wholly owned subsidiary Yahoo Japan Corporation .
2021
February 26-LINE Co., Ltd. acquired the shares of the Company held by Shiodome Z Holdings GK through a takeover bid, and LINE Co., Ltd. absorbed Shiodome Z Holdings GK. LINE Co., Ltd., which became the new parent company, will be a 50-50 stake between Naver and Softbank.
February 28-The parent company LINE Co., Ltd. transferred the business to LINE Split Preparation Co., Ltd. and changed its trade name to A Holdings Co., Ltd. 
March 1-LINE Co., Ltd. (2nd generation, former LINE Split Preparation Co., Ltd.) became a wholly owned subsidiary through a share exchange.

References

External links
Z Holdings

Companies listed on the Tokyo Stock Exchange
Internet in Japan
Z Holdings
Telecommunications companies based in Tokyo